Henry Clerke was an English lawyer and politician who sat in the House of Commons between 1621 and 1626.

Clerke was recorder of Rochester. He was elected Member of Parliament for Rochester in 1621 until 1622 under the reign of King James I. He was re-elected MP for Rochester in 1625  for both parliaments in that year under King Charles I. His political seat was the house in Rochester later named Restoration House which he created from some existing buildings.
 
In 1637, Clerke was made a serjeant-at law and some time before 1642, he acquired the manor of Ulcomb from Sir William St Leger. As Clerke supported King Charles in the Civil War, Restoration House was sequestered and used by Colonel Gibbon as a headquarters in southeast England.

Clerke married Grace Morgan, daughter of George Morgan of Crow Lane House, Rochester. His sons Francis and John were also MPs for Rochester.

References

Year of birth missing
Year of death missing
People from Rochester, Kent
English legal professionals
17th-century English lawyers
English MPs 1621–1622
English MPs 1625
English MPs 1626